For his life and a basic reading list see Napoleon I of France

Major biographies
 Asprey, Robert.  The Rise of Napoleon Bonaparte and The Reign of Napoleon Bonaparte. (2002); 2 vol, 1200pp; popular biography focusing on the military
 Barnett, Corelli. Bonaparte (1978)
 Bell, David Avrom. Napoleon: A Concise Biography (2015)
 Dwyer, Philip. Napoleon: The Path to Power (2008), to 1799 
 Emsley, Clive. Napoleon 2003 142 pp, very succinct coverage of life, France and empire; little on warfare
 Cronin, Vincent. Napoleon (1971), favorable popular bio
 Dwyer, Philip. Napoleon: The Path to Power (2008), 672 pp; vol 1 of major new biography, to 1799 
 Ellis, Geoffry. Napoleon (1997) 
 Englund, Steven. Napoleon: A Political Life. (2004). 575 pages; the best (and most advanced) political biography; thin on military 
 Falk, Avner. Napoleon Against Himself: A Psychobiography (2007) offers novel explanations for his many irrational, self-defeating, and self-destructive actions. 
 Fisher, Herbert. Napoleon  (1913) 256pp old classic online edition
 Fremont-Barnes, Gregory.  Napoleon Bonaparte (2012)
 Fournier, August. Napoleon the First: A Biography (1903);  836 pages; excellent old biography  online edition
 Herold, J. Christopher.  The Age of Napoleon (1963) 480pp, popular history stressing empire and diplomacy 
 Johnson, Paul.  Napoleon: A Penguin Life. (2002). 208 pp.  
 Lefebvre, Georges: Napoleon, (2 vol. 1935; English translation 1969), influential French perspective
 Markham, Felix. Napoleon 1963. 304pp online edition
 McLynn, Frank. Napoleon: A Biography (2003) 752pp, stress on military 
 Roberts, Andrew. Napoleon: A Life (2014)
 Rose, Tom Holland. The Life of Napoleon I: Including New Materials from the British Official Records, (2 vol 1903), old but solid scholarship;  online edition vol 2
 Schom, Alan. Napoleon Bonaparte: A Life (1997), 944pp; argues Napoleon was a paranoiac psychopath 
 Thompson, J. M. Napoleon Bonaparte: His Rise and Fall (1954)
 Tulard, Jean. Napoleon: The Myth of the Saviour (1985), influential French biography
 Woloch, Isser.  Napoleon and His Collaborators: the making of a dictatorship (2001) 
 Zamoyski, Adam. Napoleon: A Life (2018)

General reference
 Chandler, David. Dictionary of the Napoleonic Wars (1993)
  Esposito, Vincent J. and John R. Elting, A Military History and Atlas of the Napoleonic Wars (1999); textbook; includes the West Point maps
 Fremont-Barnes, Gregory. ed. The Encyclopedia of the French Revolutionary and Napoleonic Wars: A Political, Social, and Military History (ABC-CLIO: 3 vol 2006)
 Furet, François and Mona Ozouf, eds. A Critical Dictionary of the French Revolution (1989), 1120pp; long essays by scholars; conservative perspective; stress on history of ideas
 Greiss, Thomas E.  West Point Atlas for the Wars of Napoleon (1986) 70pp; all maps are online
  Nafziger, George F.  Historical Dictionary of the Napoleonic Era. 2002. 353 pp.  
 Nicholls, David.  Napoleon: A Biographical Companion. 1999. 300 pp.  
 Pope, Stephen.  Dictionary of the Napoleonic Wars. (2000). 572 pp.  
 Smith, Digby. The Greenhill Napoleonic Wars Data Book (1998); 582pp; data on 2000+ individual battles, clashes, sieges, raids, capitulations, and naval engagements

Military studies
 Adkin, Mark. The Waterloo Companion: The Complete Guide to History's Most Famous Land Battle  (2002)  448pp excerpt and text search
 Arnold, James R.  Napoleon Conquers Austria: The 1809 Campaign for Vienna. (1995). 247 pp.  excerpt and text search
Bell, David A. The First Total War: Napoleon's Europe and the Birth of Warfare as We Know It (2008) excerpt and text search
 Chandler, David. The Campaigns of Napoleon: the Mind and Method of History's Greatest Soldier (1973), 1216 pp; experts call it the best military synthesis
 Cole, Juan. Napoleon's Egypt: Invading the Middle East (2007) excerpts and online search from Amazon.com
 Connelly, Owen. Blundering to Glory: Napoleon's Military Campaigns (2nd ed 2006) negative on Napoleon's skills
 Coote, Stephen.  Napoleon and the Hundred Days. (2005). 320 pp.  
 Dodge, Theodore Ayrault. Napoleon; A History of the Art of War (1904), old classic  online edition
 Duffy, Christopher. Austerlitz, 1805 (1999)
 Duffy, Christopher. Borodino and the War of 1812 (1999). 
 Elting, John R. Swords Around a Throne: Napoleon's Grande Armée (1997), influential study 
 Epstein, Robert M. Napoleon's Last Victory and the Emergence of Modern War (1994) on Austrian war of 1809
 Esdaile, Charles J. Napoleon's Wars: An International History, 1803-1815  (2008), 656pp excerpt and text search
 Esdaile, Charles J. The French Wars 1792-1815. (2001). 96pp online edition
 Fisher, Todd. The Napoleonic Wars (2001-4) 3 vol; 96pp, short, well-illustrated operational history excerpt and text search vol 1; excerpt and text search vol 2;   excerpt and text search vol 3
 Forrest, Alan.  Napoleon's Men: The Soldiers of the Revolution and Empire. 2002. 248 pp.  
 Fortescue, J. W. A history of the British army (19v 1899-1930) full text vol 4 pt2: 1789-1801online edition vol 6: 1807-1809; full text vol 7: 1809-1810; full text vol 8: 1810-1812;  full text vol 9: 1813-1814; full text vol 10: 1814-1815
 Gates, David. The Napoleonic Wars, 1803-1815 (1997) 304pp; attacks Connolly and says N's "brilliance as a military commander has rarely been equalled let alone surpassed"
 Gill, John. With Eagles to Glory: Napoleon and his German Allies in the 1809 Campaign (1992)
 Goetz, Robert.  1805: Austerlitz; Napoleon and the Destruction of the Third Coalition (2005). 368pp
 Griffith, Paddy. The Art of War of Revolutionary France 1789-1802, (1998); 304 pp; excerpt and text search
 Hamilton-Williams, David.  Waterloo: New Perspectives; The Great Battle Reappraised. (1994). 416 pp. excerpt and text search 
 Herold, J. Christopher.  Napoleon in Egypt (1962) online edition
 Kagan, Frederick W. "Russia's Wars with Napoleon: 1805–1815", in The Military History of Tsarist Russia, ed. Frederick W. Kagan and Robin Higham (2002), 106–22. 
 Kagan, Frederick W. The End of the Old Order: Napoleon And Europe, 1801-1805 (2006) first of four promised volumes; covers the strengths and strategies of all the powers excerpt and text search
 Leggiere, Michael V.  Napoleon and Berlin: The Franco-Prussian War in North Germany, 1813. 2002. 384 pp. excerpt and text search 
 Leggiere, Michael V.  The Fall of Napoleon. 'Vol 1:' The Allied Invasion of France, 1813-1814. (2007) 690pp excerpt and text search
 Lieven, Dominic. "Russia and the Defeat of Napoleon (1812-14)." Kritika: Explorations in Russian and Eurasian History 2006 7(2): 283-308.  Fulltext: in Project MUSE. Argues Alexander's successful strategy has been neglected
 Liaropoulos, Andrew N. "Revolutions in Warfare: Theoretical Paradigms and Historical Evidence - the Napoleonic and First World War Revolutions in Military Affairs." Journal of Military History 2006 70(2): 363-384.  Fulltext: in Project MUSE 
 Lieven, Dominic. "Russia and the Defeat of Napoleon (1812–14)" Kritika: Explorations in Russian and Eurasian History 7#2 (2006) 283-308 online in Project MUSE
 Luvaas, Jay.  Napoleon on the Art of War (2001) 288 pp. A synthesis, arrangement, and translation of Napoleon's thinking. excerpt and text search 
 Lynn, John A. The Bayonets of the Republic: Motivation and Tactics in the Army of Revolutionary France, 1791–94 (1984); influential analysis excerpt and text search
 Muir, Rory. Tactics and the Experience of Battle in the Age of Napoleon (2000), 466pp excerpt and text search
 Nofi, Albert A. The Waterloo Campaign, June 1815. 1993. 333pp online edition
 Nosworthy, Brent.  With Musket, Cannon and Sword: Battle Tactics of Napoleon and His Enemies. (1996). 528 pp.  
 Paret, Peter. "Napoleon and the Revolution of War", in Paret, ed. Makers of Modern Strategy (1986)
 Pericoli, Ugo.1815: The Armies at Waterloo (1973) 
 Riley, J. P.  "How Good Was Napoleon?" History Today, (July 2007) 57#7 10pp in EBSCO
 Riley, J. P.  Napoleon and the World War of 1813: Lessons in Coalition Warfighting. (2000). 480 pp 
 Riley, Jonathon. Napoleon As a General: Command from the Battlefield to Grand Strategy (2007)
 Rogers, H.C.B. Napoleon's Army (1974)
 240pp, well illustrated synthesis by leading scholar excerpt and text search
 Rothenberg, Gunther. The Art of Warfare in the Age of Napoleon 1978
  Schneid, Frederick C. Napoleon's Italian Campaigns: 1805-1815. (2002); 229pp online edition
 Tarle, Eugene. Napoleon's Invasion of Russia, 1812. 1942. online edition

Impact on France
 Bergeron, Louis. France under Napoleon (1981), French viewpoint
 Forrest, Alan. "Propaganda and the Legitimation of Power in Napoleonic France." French History, 2004 18(4): 426-445.  Fulltext: in OUP journals 
 Furet, François. The French Revolution, 1770-1814 (1996), pp 211–65 on Napoleon
 Furet, François and Mona Ozouf, eds. A Critical Dictionary of the French Revolution (1989), 1120pp; long essays by scholars; conservative perspective
 Goubert, Pierre. The Course of French History. 1991; French textbook; ch. 14  online edition
 Lyons, Martyn. Napoleon and the Legacy of the Revolution (1994) 
 Paxton, John. Companion to the French Revolution (1987), hundreds of short entries.
 Scott, Samuel F.  and Barry Rothaus. Historical Dictionary of the French Revolution, 1789-1799 (1984), short essays by scholars
 Sutherland, D.M.G. The French Revolution and Empire: The Quest for a Civic Order (2nd ed 2003), comprehensive survey 
 Sutherland, D.M.G. France 1789–1815. Revolution and Counter-Revolution (2nd ed. 2003, 430pp) excerpts and online search from Amazon.com

Diplomacy and impact on Europe
 Blanning, T.C.W. The French Revolutionary Wars 1787-1802 (1996).
 Broers, Michael. Europe under Napoleon 1799-1815 (1996) 291pp, covers everything except the battles
 Bruun, Geoffrey. Europe and the French Imperium, 1799-1814 1938. excellent survey of all of Europe
 Dwyer, Philip G. ed. Napoleon and Europe, (2001), essays by scholars on each major power
 Ellis, Geoffrey. The Napoleonic Empire (1991) 
 Grab, Alexander. Napoleon and the Transformation of Europe. (2003), pp. 249, maps; excellent synthesis excerpt and text search
 Hill, Peter P. Napoleon's Troublesome Americans: Franco-American Relations, 1804-1815 (2005) 
 Lyons, Martyn. Napoleon and the Legacy of the Revolution (1994) 
 Muir, Rory.  Britain and the Defeat of Napoleon, 1807-1815. (1996). 466 pp.  
 Parker, Harold T. "Why Did Napoleon Invade Russia? A Study in Motivation and the Interrelations of Personality and Social Structure", Journal of Military History 54 (April 1990): 131–46. in JSTOR
 Rothenberg, Gunther E. "The Origins, Causes, and Extension of the Wars of the French Revolution and Napoleon", Journal of Interdisciplinary History, Vol. 18, No. 4, (Spring, 1988), pp. 771–793 in JSTOR
 Rude, George F. and Harvey J. Kaye.Revolutionary Europe, 1783-1815' (2000), scholarly survey
 Schroeder, Paul W. "Napoleon's Foreign Policy: A Criminal Enterprise", Journal of Military History 54 (April 1990): 147–62. Highly negative
 Schroeder, Paul. The Transformation of European Politics, 1763-1848. 1996; Elaborate detail; advanced history; very hostile to Napoleon; online edition
 Woolf, Stuart. Napoleon's Integration of Europe (1991) 320pp online edition
 Cambridge Modern History (1907) vol 9: Napoleon online edition, older articles by scholars, 900pp

Historiography and Memory
 Black, Jeremy. "Why the French Failed: New Work on the Military History of French Imperialism 1792-1815." European History Quarterly 2000 30(1): 105-115.  Fulltext: in Sage journals
 Datta, Venita. "'L'appel Au Soldat': Visions of the Napoleonic Legend in Popular Culture of the Belle Epoque." French Historical Studies 2005 28(1): 1-30.  
 Dunne, John. "Napoleon: For or against ... and Beyond." History Review. Issue: 27. 1997. pp 17+.  online edition
 Dwyer, Philip G. "Napoleon Bonaparte as Hero and Saviour: Image, Rhetoric and Behaviour in the Construction of a Legend", French History 2004 18(4): 379-403, 
 Forrest, Robert F.  "Rumor into Myth: the Image of Napoleon among the Romanians, 1800-1848", Consortium on Revolutionary Europe 1750-1850: Proceedings 1992 21: 98-105
 Geyl, Pieter. Napoleon: For and Against (1949) online edition, debates among scholars
 Hazareesingh, Sudhir. The Legend of Napoleon (2005) excerpt and text search
 Hazareesingh, Sudhir. "Memory and Political Imagination: the Legend of Napoleon Revisited." French History, 2004 18(4): 463-483.  Fulltext: in Oxford up 
 Hazareesingh, Sudhir. "Bonapartist Memory and Republican Nation-building: Revisiting the Civic Festivities of the Second Empire", Modern & Contemporary France 2003 11(3): 349-364
 Heit, Siegfried. "German Romanticism: an Ideological Response to Napoleon", Consortium on Revolutionary Europe 1750-1850: Proceedings 1980 1: 187-197. Argues that German opposition to Napoleon led German Romanticism to reject the chief ideals represented by the French Revolution and Napoleon. Uses the works of Arndt, Fichte, Jahn, Kleist, and Schleiermacher, to show how German Romanticism became identified with political reaction and nationalism, and how it opposed political liberalism, rationalism, neoclassicism, and cosmopolitanism. 
 Horward, Donald D. "Napoleon and Beethoven", Consortium on Revolutionary Europe 1750-1850: Proceedings 1980 2: 3-13, 
 Markham, J. David. "Napoleon and the Romantic Poets", Consortium on Revolutionary Europe 1750-1850: Selected Papers 1998: 651-663, 
 Newman, Edgar Leon. "Defanging the Revolution: How the Memory of the French Revolution Was Changed in French Working-class Poetry and Song, 1830-52", Consortium on Revolutionary Europe 1750-1850: Selected Papers 1995: 591-605, 
 Nieuwazny, Andrzej. "Napoleon and Polish identity." History Today, May 1998 v48 n5 pp. 50–55
 O'Brien, David. After the Revolution: Antoine-Jean Gros, Painting and Propaganda under Napoleon (2006) 288p.

 Pinkney, David. ed., Napoleon: Historical Enigma (1969)
 Schönpflug, Daniel. "So Far, and Yet So Near: Comparison, Transfer and Memory in Recent German Books on the Age of the French Revolution and Napoleon", French History 2004 18(4): 446-462
 Stock, Paul. "Imposing on Napoleon: the Romantic Appropriation of Bonaparte", Journal of European Studies 2006 36(4): 363-388, deals with English Romantic writers
 Wilson-Smith, Timothy. Napoleon and His Artists'' (1996)

Bibliographies of people
 Bibliography
Napoleonic Wars